Stamsnijder is a surname. Notable people with the surname include:

Hennie Stamsnijder (born 1954), Dutch bicycle racer
Tom Stamsnijder (born 1985), Dutch bicycle racer

Dutch-language surnames